Edith Chen is a scientist known for researching the psychosocial and biological pathways that explain relationships between low socioeconomic status and physical health outcomes in childhood. She is currently a professor at Northwestern University. Scientific Award for an early career contribution within her first nine years of receiving her PhD. Chen was awarded the 2015 George A. Miller Award for an Outstanding Recent Article on General Psychology for the article “Psychological stress in childhood and susceptibility to the chronic diseases of aging: Moving toward a model of behavioral and biological mechanisms” alongside authors Gregory E. Miller, and Karen J. Parker.

Biography 
Chen grew up in Miami, Florida. Since Chen was in high school, she always loved science.  Chen competed in science fairs in high school and also was able to work and conduct research in a lab which sparked her interest in science. In 1998 she earned her PhD in Clinical Psychology from University of California, Los Angeles. From 2000-2002, she was an assistant professor at Washington University in St. Louis.  From 2003-2012, she was the Canada Research Chair in Health and Society at the University of British Columbia in Vancouver, Canada.  She began her position as Professor of Psychology and Faculty Fellow at the Institute for Policy Research at Northwestern University in 2012.  She is currently the John D. and Catherine T. MacArthur Professor. At Northwestern University she spends time doing research and teaching.  On the research side of things, she oversees numerous scientific projects, co-directs a research lab, and writes grants and research articles. On the teaching side of things, she teaches undergraduate lectures and runs seminars for graduate students.

Research 
Chen's research is centered around understanding the psychosocial and biological contributors to socioeconomic inequalities in health outcomes in children.  One key area of work has been around resilience, that is, the factors that contribute to positive health outcomes among children who grow up under adversity. Overall her findings explore and explain why low income socioeconomic status is associated with poorer physical health not only in childhood but throughout adulthood as well, and the factors that can mitigate these outcomes.                

Some of Chen's research projects include an Asthma study, a Mentoring and Health Study, and a Skin-deep resilience study.  The asthma study is about investigating youth from low socioeconomic status families and understanding what physical and social environmental factors contribute to their asthma outcomes.  This project investigates factors at the neighborhood, family, child, and as well, cellular levels. The mentoring and health study is testing whether youth who receive or provide mentoring gain cardiovascular health benefits from the program.  The skin-deep resilience study is testing the idea that low-income youth of color who achieve academic successes often experience a physical health cost to their success.

Representative publications 

 Chen, E., Matthews, K. A., & Boyce, W. T. (2002). Socioeconomic differences in children's health: how and why do these relationships change with age?. Psychological Bulletin, 128(2), 295. 
 Miller, G. E., Chen, E., & Parker, K. J. (2011). Psychological stress in childhood and susceptibility to the chronic diseases of aging: moving toward a model of behavioral and biological mechanisms. Psychological Bulletin, 137(6), 959. 
 Schreier, H. M. C. & Chen, E. (2013).  Socioeconomic status and the health of youth:  A multi-level multi-domain approach to conceptualizing pathways.  Psychological Bulletin, 139, 606-654. 
 Schreier, H. M. C., Schonert-Reichl, K. A., & Chen, E. (2013).  Effect of volunteering on risk for cardiovascular disease in adolescents:  A randomized control trial.  JAMA – Pediatrics, 167, 327-332. 
 Brody, G. H., Yu, T., Miller, G. E., & Chen. E. (2016).  Resilience in adolescence, health, and psychosocial outcomes.  Pediatrics, 138, e20161042. 
 Levine, C. S., Markus, H. R., Austin, M. K., Chen, E., & Miller, G. E. (2019). Students of color show health advantages when they attend schools that emphasize the value of diversity. Proceedings of the National Academy of Sciences, 116, 6013-6018.

References

External links 

Faculty profile
Foundations of Health Research Center at Northwestern University Profile

Northwestern University faculty
University of California, Los Angeles alumni
Harvard College alumni